The Primonetta Stakes is an American Thoroughbred horse race held annually in April at either Pimlico Race Course in Baltimore, Maryland or Laurel Park in Laurel, Maryland. The Primonetta Stakes is open to fillies and mares three years old and up and is raced at six furlongs on the dirt.

The race was named for Primonetta, the 1962 American Champion Older Female Horse.

Records 

Speed record: 
 6 furlongs - 1:10.67 - Bold Affair  (2012)

Most wins by a jockey:
 3 - Abel Castellano (2011, 2012 & 2013)

Most wins by a trainer:
 2 - Howard Wolfendale (2012 & 2013)

Most wins by an owner:
 2 - Charles Reed/Michael Zanella   (2012 & 2013)

Winners of the Primonetta Stakes

See also 
Primonetta Stakes top three finishers and starters

References

Pimlico Race Course
Recurring sporting events established in 1988
1988 establishments in Maryland
Horse races in Maryland